Claes Fahlander (born 21 January 1948 in Gothenburg) is a Swedish physicist. After having graduated from Gävle in 1967, he joined Uppsala University, where he obtained his bachelor's degree in mathematics and physics in 1972. He became a Ph.D. in nuclear physics in 1977,  and a teacher in 1982. Between 1979 and 1982 he worked at Australian National University in Canberra, and in the next decade he was active at Uppsala University. From 1995 to 1997 he did a sabbatical as a researcher at the Laboratori Nazionali di Legnaro in Italy, and on 1 July 1996 he succeeded Hans Ryde as professor of Cosmic and Subatomic Physics at Department of Physics at Lund University.

Fahlanders has mainly concerned his research with studies of the shape of the atomic nucleus, its core patterns and electromagnetic properties, as well as forces between protons and neutrons in nuclear nuclei. Among his discoveries was when he and his research team in 2016 verified the discovery of element 115, which had previously been discovered in Dubna, Russia in 2003.

Fahlander was elected as a member of the Royal Physiographic Society in Lund in 1998 and as a member of the Royal Swedish Academy of Sciences in 2006.

References 

1948 births
Living people
Swedish physicists
Members of the Royal Swedish Academy of Sciences
Lund University alumni
Academic staff of Lund University
People from Gothenburg
20th-century Swedish people